Franklin Murphy may refer to:

Franklin Murphy (governor) (1846–1920), 31st Governor of New Jersey
Franklin David Murphy (1916–1994), University of California official

See also
Frank Murphy (disambiguation)